Shuttle Loop is a type of steel launched shuttle roller coaster designed by Reinhold Spieldiener of Intamin and manufactured by Anton Schwarzkopf.  A total of 12 installations were produced between 1977 and 1982. These 12 installations have been located in a total of 22 different amusement parks.

History
The first installation of a Shuttle Loop dates back to 1977 when King Kobra opened at Kings Dominion. Two other rides were also installed that year: White Lightnin' at Carowinds and Tidal Wave at Marriott's Great America (California). Tidal Wave at Marriott's Great America (Illinois) opened in 1978 and was the last to feature the weight drop launch system. Also that year, Knott's Berry Farm opened Montezooma's Revenge and Six Flags AstroWorld opened Greezed Lightnin' as the first installations to feature the flywheel launch system. A number of installations followed across the world.

Twenty-two theme parks have operated Shuttle Loops, with half of the twelve original installations being relocated at some time. , only six installations are operating, with another one in storage. The remaining Shuttle Loops were either demolished or used for replacement parts on other installations.

Notable installations
 The original King Kobra from Kings Dominion is the most traveled shuttle loop, having operated at Kings Dominion, Jolly Roger Amusement Park, Alton Towers and Hopi Hari.
 Montezooma's Revenge at Knott's Berry Farm is the longest running shuttle loop that is still in its original location. All of the shuttle loops that were installed before it have either been moved or destroyed. Following the closure of Kentucky Kingdom's Greezed Lightnin' in 2009, "Zooma" became the only operating shuttle loop in the United States until Niagara Amusement Park & Splash World's Shuttle Loop. As of February 2022, Montezooma's Revenge is under a major refurbishment and is set to reopen in 2023.
 Shuttle Loop at Nagashima Spa Land is the only remaining Shuttle Loop operating in Asia.
 The first European Shuttle Loop, Sirocco, was installed in 1982 at Walibi Wavre in Belgium. In 1999, the ride was partially enclosed to reduce noise and was renamed Turbine. Turbine closed in 2008 and reopened in 2013 with a new train from Gerstlauer and a new name, Psyké Underground. The ride is now completely enclosed making it the first indoor shuttle loop.
 The shuttle loop, Greezed Lightnin', that operated at Kentucky Kingdom from 2003 to 2009 was composed of the two Tidal Wave Shuttle Loops from the Marriott's Great America parks in California and Illinois. 
 The final new installation was Shuttle Loop at Oyama Yuenchi in 1990.

Ride

Experience
Once the momentum of the train runs out on the 70° spike, the train begins to traverse the track backwards, returning through the loop.

Mechanics
Anton Schwarzkopf designed the Shuttle Loop in the late 1970s. He filed a patent for the concept in 1978 which was approved the following year. The patent describes two launch systems, both of which were implemented in various roller coasters:
 Weight drop – a number of the early installations in 1977 and 1978 featured a weight drop launch system. This system involved a catch car attaching itself to the train, which was attached to the weight via a cable. When the launch was triggered, the  weight was dropped down a shaft pulling the cable and catch car which in turn pushed the train down the launch track.
 Flywheel - from 1978, all of the new installations featured a flywheel launch system. This system consists of a  flywheel which is spun at over 1000 revolutions per minute. This flywheel engages a drive system, through a system of multiple clutches, that is attached to a cable that in-turn propels the train forward.

Gerstlauer completed an upgrade of Walibi Belgium's installation for the 2013 season. As part of the upgrade Gerstlauer replaced the existing flywheel launch system with a new linear induction motor (LIM) launch system. The company also added a new train. The ride was then completely enclosed and relaunched as Psyké Underground. The flywheel launch system is now displayed in the queue of the ride.

Installations

Incidents

On August 27, 1997, the Sirocco at Walibi Wavre failed to launch at the correct speed. The train went to the loop very slowly and up the spike, to roll backwards. During the backwards passage of the loop, the train halted at the uppermost point, causing the train to get stuck hanging upside-down.  The passengers were hanging heads-down for one hour and twenty minutes, only held in place with lap bar restraints. The train was pulled back further down the track with help of the local fire station brigade.

A 20-year-old woman died on September 1, 2001, one day after riding Montezooma's Revenge, the Shuttle Loop at Knott's Berry Farm. She suffered a ruptured middle cerebral artery, and an autopsy revealed a pre-existing condition. The ride was closed for several days while an investigation was conducted. Though state investigators concluded that the ride did not contribute to her death, a wrongful death lawsuit was later filed by her family in 2002. The lawsuit was dismissed in 2006.

Notes

References

External links
 
 Shuttle Loop at the Roller Coaster DataBase

Mass-produced roller coasters
Roller coasters introduced in 1977